Serious Fun may refer to:

 Serious Fun, a 1987 album by The Firm
 Serious Fun (Lester Bowie album), 1989
 Serious Fun (George Gruntz album), 1990
 Serious Fun (The Knack album), 1991
 SeriousFun Children's Network, a global network of children's camps and programs